Flowerdale is a former locality in southern Alberta, Canada within Special Area No. 2. The settlement consisted of a post office, general store, and a sod house. Flowerdale has since been left uninhabited.

See also 
List of communities in Alberta

References

External links 
 Roads to Rose Lynn - History book
 Place Names: Alberta GenWeb - Flowerdale; 1-28-12-w4; Special Area 2; Former Locality
 A. R. Stewart's stone house at Flowerdale, Alberta.
 We'll all be Buried Down Here : the Prairie Dryland Disaster, 1917-1926 - Our Roots

Special Area No. 2